Paruparo cebuensis is a species of butterfly in the family Lycaenidae. It is found in the Philippines.

Description
Its forewing length is 15–18 mm.

Subspecies and range
The nominotypical subspecies cebuensis is distributed on Cebu island. Subspecies treadawayi is distributed on Negros island, ametystina on Homonhon island, soloni on Bohol island, medicieloi on Leyte island, and chotaroi on Mindanao island.

References 

 , 1977: New subspecies of Jamides and Charana from Mindanao (Lepidoptera: Lycaenidae). Tyô to Ga. 28(4): 167-168. 
 , 1995: Checklist of the butterflies of the Philippine Islands (Lepidoptera: Rhopalocera). Nachrichten des Entomologischen Vereins Apollo, Suppl. 14: 7-118.
 , 2012: Revised checklist of the butterflies of the Philippine Islands (Lepidoptera: Rhopalocera). Nachrichten des Entomologischen Vereins Apollo, Suppl. 20: 1-64.

Butterflies described in 1975
Paruparo